Alexeni airfield was a military airfield, which was proposed as a new low-cost airport for Bucharest, located in the Alexeni town, in Ialomița County, at 60 km north-east of the capital city of Romania.

Until 2001 a Romanian Air Force military helicopter unit was based on this airfield. Former Minister of Transport Radu Berceanu suggested the location for Bucharest's new low-cost flights airport (as the operational tariffs for Bucharest's previous  low-cost hub, Aurel Vlaicu Airport, were set to grow). However, some analysts considered the project unrealistic and doomed to fail due to the poor conditions of the infrastructure in the area. AllBucharest's low-cost flights were moved at Henri Coandă International Airport in March 2012.

Ialomița County Council, which is the airfield's owner since 2017, launched the auction for the airport concession in August/September 2022, three potential investors expressed their interest, but no one submitted the tender offer at the end of the legal period. The authorities expect the value of the investment needed at cca. €150 mil. The airport concession bid was announced again in December 2022, with eight potential investors who expressed their interest.

External links
 Google Map - Aerial View

See also

Aviation in Romania
Transport in Romania

References

Airports in Romania